William Bullard (1594-December 23, 1686.) was an early resident and two term Selectman in Dedham, Massachusetts. He built the first bridge across the Charles River in Dedham at the site of the present day Ames Street Bridge. He also served in the trainband led by Eleazer Lusher.

Bullard was born in England in 1594 and first settled in Watertown in 1635 before moving to Dedham. He signed the Dedham Covenant. He moved for a time to Cambridge, Massachusetts.

He was an ancestor of Isaac Bullard. He died December 23, 1686, at the home of his daughter.

References

Works cited

Dedham, Massachusetts selectmen
People from Watertown, Massachusetts
1594 births
1686 deaths
Signers of the Dedham Covenant
Kingdom of England emigrants to Massachusetts Bay Colony
Military personnel from Dedham, Massachusetts
People from colonial Dedham, Massachusetts